The Herz und Diabeteszentrum (Heart and Diabetes Centre), is a heart clinic in the German town Bad Oeynhausen. It is known for performing the most heart transplants in Europe (over 2,200 since 1989).


Cooperations 
Besides having a lot of cooperations with the clinics and institutes of the Ruhr-Universität Bochum, it has a lot of national and international cooperations.
International cooperations are:
 Hôpital de la Pitié-Salpêtrière, Paris, France
 Saitama Medical School Saitama University, Japan
 Nihon University Tokio, Japan
 University of Pécs, Hungary
 University clinic Lyon, France
 Universitätskliniken Salzburg, Austria
 Texas Heart Institute, Houston/Texas, USA 
 Babeș-Bolyai University, Cluj-Napoca, Romania 
 International Prevention Organization, IPO
 TEDA International Cardiovascular Hospital, Tianjin, China

General orientation 
The general orientation of the HDZ NRW is to improve the quality of living of cardiac and diabetes patients by a great amount. The patients get the best treatment with a low risk due to their high performance technology.

References

Hospitals in Germany
Medical and health organisations based in North Rhine-Westphalia
Heart disease organizations